The United Transformation Movement (UTM) is a political party in Malawi founded by Saulos Chilima, Vice President of Malawi.

History

On 21 July 2018, Saulos Chilima launched his transformation movement called United Transformation Movement (UTM) towards formation of his political party to contest in May 2019 elections. On 1 February 2019 Chilima's UTM held meetings with two other political parties and an alliance of smaller political parties aimed at forming a united opposition. The other parties to the discussion were the Alliance for Democracy (Aford), former Malawi President Joyce Banda's Peoples Party, and the Tikonze People's Movement led by former Vice President Cassim Chilumpha. They agreed to field one presidential candidate for the May 2019 elections. Both Joyce Banda and Cassim Chilumpha later withdrew from the alliance citing "disagreement with the selection of a presidential running mate for the candidate of the upcoming election" as their reason.

In the 2019 Malawian general election that was later nullified, Chilima alongside Dr Michael Usi as a running mate came third with 20.24% of the popular vote and United Transformation Movement won 4 seats in the National Assembly. The presidential election of 2019 was held again in 2020.

In the 2020 presidential election, Chilima contested the race as Lazarus Chakwera's running mate for the Malawi Congress Party, in the tonse alliance which brought up to nine opposition political parties with hopes to topple the Mutharika administration.

References 

2018 establishments in Malawi
Political parties established in 2018
Political parties in Malawi